Disphragis rhodoglene is a moth of the family Notodontidae. It is found in north-eastern Ecuador.

The length of the forewings is about 23.5 mm. The ground colour of the forewings is moss green to olive green. The ground colour of the hindwings is golden white in the basal third and dirty grey-brown beyond.

Etymology
The species name is derived from Greek rhodon (meaning red) and glene (meaning pupil of the eye) and refers to the reddish brown reniform spot.

References

Moths described in 2011
Notodontidae